A science book is a work of nonfiction, usually written by a scientist, researcher, or professor like Stephen Hawking (A Brief History of Time), or sometimes by a non-scientist such as Bill Bryson  (A Short History of Nearly Everything).  Usually these books are written for a wide audience presumed to have a general education rather than a specifically scientific training, as opposed to the very narrow audience that a scientific paper would have, and are therefore referred to as popular science.  As such, they require considerable talent on the part of the author to sufficiently explain difficult topics to 
people who are totally new to the subject, and a good blend of storytelling and technical writing.  In the UK, the Royal Society Prizes for Science Books are considered to be the most prestigious awards for science writing. In the US, the National Book Awards briefly had a category for science writing in the 1960s, but now they just have the broad categories of fiction and nonfiction.

There are many disciplines that are well explained to lay people through science books.  A few examples include Carl Sagan on astronomy, Jared Diamond on geography, Stephen Jay Gould and Richard Dawkins on evolutionary biology, David Eagleman on neuroscience, Donald Norman on usability and cognitive psychology, Steven Pinker, Noam Chomsky, and Robert Ornstein on linguistics and cognitive science, Donald Johanson and Robert Ardrey on paleoanthropology, and Desmond Morris on zoology and anthropology, and Fulvio Melia on black holes.

Mary Somerville's On the Connexion of the Physical Sciences (first edition 1834) was arguably the first book in the genre of popular science.

Notable examples
 The Best American Science and Nature Writing – book series
 The Best American Science Writing – book series
 The Best Science Writing Online 2012 – Scientific American showcasing more than fifty online essays 
 Popular Science (UK) – website on books and authors

See also
 List of science magazines

References

External links
 The Royal Society Winton Prize for Science Books

Science books